Karen Eileen Spilka (born January 11, 1953) is an American politician and attorney serving as a Democratic member of the Massachusetts Senate. She represents the 2nd Middlesex and Norfolk district, which includes the towns of Ashland, Framingham, Franklin, Holliston, Hopkinton, Medway and Natick in the MetroWest region of Massachusetts. She has served as the 95th President of the Massachusetts Senate since July 2018. Previously she served as a member of the Massachusetts House of Representatives from 2001 to 2005.

Spilka's legislative accomplishments include efforts in a broad range of areas including economic development, jobs creation, education, juvenile justice and services for the elderly and disabled communities.

Early life and education 
Karen Spilka was born in New York City and grew up in Yonkers, New York. She is a graduate of Northeastern University School of Law and holds a Bachelor of Science from Cornell University.

When she was a child, her father suffered from mental illness and her sister had Down Syndrome.

Early career 
Spilka was first elected to the Massachusetts House of Representatives in the fall of 2001, where she served three years before her election to the Massachusetts State Senate in January 2005. In the Senate she has served as the Chair of the Joint Committee on Children, Families and Persons with Disabilities, the Chair of the Joint Committee on Economic Development and Emerging Technologies and the Majority Whip. Prior to becoming a legislator, Spilka worked in private practice as an arbitrator and mediator, specializing in labor and employment law and community and court mediation. In addition, she has been a facilitator and fact finder in disputes in the public and private sectors, as well as a social worker and trainer of adult mediation and school-based peer mediation programs, collaborative-based collective bargaining and conflict resolution strategies.

Prior to becoming Senate President, she served as Chair of the Senate Committee on Ways and Means, overseeing the creation of the annual state budget.

Spilka previously served on the Ashland School Committee (chair, vice-chair), Ashland Democratic Town Committee, Ashland Fiscal Affairs Committee, and Charter Review Committee, and the Massachusetts Personnel Board. She is also associated with the following organizations: 495/MetroWest Corridor Partnership, MetroWest Economic Research Center at Framingham State University, MetroWest ESL Fund, Ashland Education Foundation, Ashland Lions.

Regional transportation 
Along with Dennis Giombetti, a selectboard member from Framingham, Spilka spearheaded the creation of the MetroWest Regional Transit Authority to provide residents of the region greater access to public transportation.

Criminal justice reform 
Spilka acted as leader on An Act relative to criminal justice reform which was signed into law in 2018. Following Massachusetts' 2016 legalization of non-medical Marijuana, this law eliminated certain mandatory minimum sentences for low level, non-violent drug offences and allowed records for convictions for offenses that are no longer crimes, such as marijuana possession, to be expunged. This bill also altered how bail is set in order to ensure that individuals are not jailed solely because they are unable to pay, raised the minimum age of criminal responsibility in Massachusetts from seven to 12 years old (the international standard), decriminalized several minor offenses for juveniles, and required more humane conditions for inmates in solitary confinement.

LGBT rights and Gender identity 
Spilka describes herself as an "early and ardent supporter of equal marriage and transgender protections". In 2004, at that time a representative, she joined many of her colleagues in voting for Massachusetts to become the first state in the United States to allow same-sex marriage.

In 2018, Spilka joined Senators Patricia Jehlen and Julian Cyr to create bill S.2562 - an act relative to gender identity on Massachusetts identification. The bill would have established a non-binary gender identity option for state licenses, allowing applicants to choose "X" instead of male or female. The bill passed the Senate, but was made irrelevant before it could become law as the Massachusetts Registry of Motorized Vehicles voluntarily moved to allow Massachusetts residents to select a nonbinary gender marker.

Life sciences 
Spilka has been a noted supporter of biotechnology. Prior to becoming Senate President, she chaired the Biotech Legislative Caucus and has been recognized for her dedicated work to advance the biotechnology industry in Massachusetts. According to the Biotechnology Industry Organization, her efforts to include life sciences and the medical technology industry in the state's economic development initiatives have worked to "foster a pro-business and pro-biotechnology environment in Massachusetts". Spilka is also a founder and former Chair of the Tech Hub Caucus.

2013 congressional campaign 

The primary election was held on October 15, 2013, and Katherine Clark won the Democratic nomination.

Though defeated, Spilka was consistently ranked as the preferred candidate among the region's unions, and was endorsed by the Central Massachusetts AFL-CIO, the statewide ATU, the UNITE-HERE New England Joint Board, UWUA Local 369, Roofers and Waterproofers Union Local 33, Laborers' Local 22, Laborers' Local 151, Laborers' Local 380, Laborers' Local 609, Laborers' Local 1116, Laborers' Local 1156, the Sprinkler Fitters 550, IBEW Local 1505, UFCW Local 328, UFCW Local 1445, the Boston Carmen's Union Local 589, the Building Wreckers Local 1421, the Mail Handlers Local 301, and the American Postal Workers Union Local 4553.

Massachusetts Senate President (2018-present) 
On July 26, 2018, Spilka was unanimously elected by the members of the Massachusetts Senate to serve as the President of the Senate, making her the third woman to hold this office. Following a tumultuous period in the Massachusetts Senate, Spilka was regarded by her colleagues as a source of stability and a more collaborative leader than previous Senate Presidents.

Education funding 
Upon becoming Senate President, Spilka's "first priority" was the passage of the Student Opportunity Act. Totaling $1.5 Billion, this law included the largest increase in education funding in Massachusetts’ history. Signed into law in 2019, the Student Opportunity Act adjusted the formula used by the state to calculate the cost of educating students by updating costs related to health care, special education, English language learning, and programs for low-income students. The act also encourages schools districts to use additional funds on programs to support students’ "social-emotional and physical health," in line with Spilka's longstanding support for social-emotional learning.

After having been delayed due to the COVID-19 Pandemic, the Student Opportunity Act will be phased in starting in 2022.

Racial justice and police reform 

In the wake of the murder of George Floyd, Spilka announced the creation of a racial justice advisory group led by Massachusetts Senators Sonia Chang-Diaz and William Brownsberger to draft legislation in response to police brutality, which was subsequently passed and signed into law by Governor Charlie Baker. This sweeping police reform law, An Act relative to justice, equity and accountability in law enforcement in the Commonwealth, is notable for pioneering multiple novel approaches to police reform. The law created a first-in-the-nation civilian-led commission to standardize the certification and decertification of police officers, with the power to conduct independent investigations into police misconduct, and also created the first state-wide restriction on law enforcement's use of facial recognition technology in the United States. The bill furthermore banned the use of chokeholds and created a duty to intervene for police officers when witnessing another officer using force inappropriately. The law was hailed as 'robust' by commentators, including the ACLU's Director of Racial Justice, who noted that it created "probably the strongest" police oversight commission in the country.

In recognition of these and other actions to advance equity and racial justice in Massachusetts, Spilka was awarded the Chaney Goodman Schwerner Advocacy Award by the New England Area Conference of the NAACP in 2020.

Union opposition 
In 2022 Spilka released a statement saying the Massachusetts Senate did not "see a path forward" for efforts by Senate staffers to unionize. Staffers has been seeking recognition after announcing their intention to unionize earlier that year and denounced the response as anti-union.

References

External links 
Senator Karen E. Spilka at the Massachusetts Legislature
Karen Spilka constituency site

1953 births
21st-century American politicians
21st-century American women politicians
Cornell University alumni
Living people
Democratic Party Massachusetts state senators
Women state legislators in Massachusetts